Semaeopus is a genus of moths in the family Geometridae erected by Gottlieb August Wilhelm Herrich-Schäffer in 1855.

Species 
 Semaeopus argocosma
 Semaeopus callichroa
 Semaeopus cantona
 Semaeopus castaria
 Semaeopus ella
 Semaeopus gracilata
 Semaeopus indignaria
 Semaeopus marginata
 Semaeopus vincentii

References

Cosymbiini